Dhairya Karwa (born 19 November 1990) is an Indian actor and former model who primarily works in Hindi films. He made his acting debut with Uri: The Surgical Strike (2019). He is best known for his portrayal of Ravi Shastri in 83 (2021) and an unemployed writer in Gehraiyaan (2022).

Early life
Karwa was born on 19 November 1990 in Jaipur, Rajasthan. Karwa studied at Shri Ram College of Commerce, University of Delhi. Karwa played basketball for his college, and represented the Uttarakhand State team. He worked as a data analyst in Gurugram, before becoming a model. He modeled for many brands like Star Movies and Kerala Tourism.

Career
Karwa made his acting debut in 2019 with Uri: The Surgical Strike. He portrayed Captain Sartaj Singh Chandhok. The film was a box office success grossing ₹359.73 crore. The same year, he made his web debut with Made in Heaven portraying Samar Ranawat.

He next appeared in the 2020 short film Amritsar Junction. He portrayed a rioter in the film based on 1947 communal riots during the Partition of India.

In 2021, he appeared in Kabir Khan's sports film 83, where he portrayed cricketer Ravi Shastri. Despite the positive reviews, the film was unsuccessful at the Indian box office, it grossed ₹193.73 crore. Karwan received moderately positive reviews for his performance.

Karwan next portrayed an unemployed write, Karan Arora in Shakun Batra's Gehraiyaan, opposite Deepika Padukone. The film premiered on 11 February 2022 on Amazon Prime Video and received mixed-to-positive reviews from critics. Pinkvilla noted, "Dhairya Karwa makes his presence felt enough while sharing screen space with Deepika." While DNA India mentioned, "Karwa makes a solid impression by playing the ignorant partner."

He will next appear alongside Tara Sutaria in Apurva.

Media image
Karwa is a prominent celebrity endorser for brands and products including Slice and Shoppers Stop.

Filmography

Films

Web series

References

External links

 

Living people
21st-century Indian male actors
Male actors in Hindi cinema
1990 births
Male actors from Mumbai